Telipna ruspinoides, the ruspinoid telipna, is a butterfly in the family Lycaenidae. It is found in south-eastern Nigeria, southern Cameroon, the Republic of the Congo, Gabon and the Central African Republic. The habitat consists of forests.

References

Butterflies described in 1923
Poritiinae